Christian influences in Islam can be traced back to Eastern Christianity, which surrounded the origins of Islam. Islam, emerging in the context of the Middle East that was largely Christian, was first seen as a Christological heresy known as the "heresy of the Ishmaelites", described as such in Concerning Heresy by Saint John of Damascus, a Syriac scholar.

Christians introduced the Muslims to Greek learning. Eastern Christian scientists and scholars of the medieval Islamic world (particularly Nestorian Christians) contributed to the Arab Islamic civilization during the Umayyad and the Abbasid periods by translating works of Greek philosophers to Syriac and afterwards to Arabic. They also excelled in philosophy, science, theology and medicine.

Scholars and intellectuals agree Eastern Christians have made significant contributions to Arab and Islamic civilization since the introduction of Islam, and they have had a significant impact contributing the culture of the Middle East and North Africa and other areas. 

Christian communities have played a vital role in the Muslim World. Pew Research Center estimates indicate that in 2010, more than 64 million Christians lived in countries with Muslim majorities (excluding Nigeria). The Pew Forum study finds that Indonesia (21.1 million) has the largest Christian population in the Muslim world, followed by Egypt, Chad and Kazakhstan. The majority of Muslim countries also use a Gregorian calendar and some countries observe Sunday as a non-working day (cf. Sunday Sabbatarianism).

Prayer and worship

The religion of Islam was significantly molded by Assyrians and Jews. In explicating the origin of the Islamic salat, academics state that it was influenced by the religions prevalent in the Middle East during the time of Muhammad, such as Christianity and Judaism. The five fixed prayer times in Islamic prayer may have their origins in the canonical hours of Christians, especially those used in the 4th century by believers in the Oriental Orthodox Churches (that were widely regarded as Miaphysite) who prayed seven times a day, given the extensive contact that Muhammad and his companions had with Syrian Christian monks. Abu Bakr and other early followers of Muhammad were exposed to these fixed times of prayer of the Syrian Christians in Abyssinia and likely relayed their observations to Muhammad, "placing the potential for Christian influence directly within the Prophet's circle of followers and leaders." Muhammad, who had direct contact with the Christians of Najrān in Yemen, would have been aware of the Christian practice of facing east while praying, which was ubiquitous in Christendom at the time. The position of prostration used by the Desert Fathers, Coptic Christian monks of Egypt, may have influenced the position of sujjud, marked by the Quranic symbol ۩.

Ritual washing before performing the Salah was influenced by the Jewish practice of washing one's hands and feet before praying, a practice common among the Jews in Syria, Yathrib and Yemen; the Babylonian Talmud teaches that in the absence of water, earth should be used, a practice adopted in Islam. The Jews face Jerusalem when praying and the Qur'an records that the early Muslims did the same, with the direction of prayer facing Mecca being changed to this later. Justin Paul Hienz regards these as clear examples of syncretism in which Judaism influenced religious practice in Islam.

Fasting
According to historian Philip Jenkins, Ramadan comes "from the strict Lenten discipline of the Syrian Churches", a postulation corroborated by other scholars, such as the theologian Paul-Gordon Chandler.

Language
In the late 7th and 8th centuries, Muslims encountered Levantine Christians. The cognate Syriac word  may have influenced the Arabic  ('martyr-witness'). During the Abbasid dynasty, translations of the gospels from Syriac into Arabic were made, particularly by historian Bar-Hebraeus, at the request of the Arab governor.

the word 'Arab' is thought by some Historians to be an Assyrian word, meaning "Westerner". The first written reference to Arabs was by the Assyrian King Sennacherib, 800 B.C., in which he tells of conquering the "ma'rabayeh" (Westerners).

Art

Roman and Byzantine styles were particularly prevalent in early Islamic architecture. One of the examples is the Dome of the Rock (late 7th century) in Jerusalem. Its design is derived from Roman architecture. Madrasa-Mausoleum of Sultan Al Nasir Muhammad in Cairo has a Gothic doorway from Acre, reused as a trophy. The former Christian cathedral Madrasat al-Halawiyya in Aleppo, probably taken by Nur ad-Din Zangi, featured an altar. The Jami'a Al Aqsa has a sculpted ornament, taken from Crusader structures of the 12th century, in the arches of the facade. The upper double capital of the mosque on twisted columns expresses the unity of nature in a characteristic Romanesque style.

After the fall of Constantinople, the Ottomans converted a major basilica, Hagia Sophia, to a mosque and incorporated Byzantine architectural elements into their own work, such as domes. This was a part of the conversion of non-Muslim places of worship into mosques. The Hagia Sophia also served as model for many Ottoman mosques, such as the Shehzadeh Mosque, the Suleiman Mosque and the Rüstem Pasha Mosque.

Christological motifs could be found in the works of Nizami, Rumi and others. Islamic artists applied Christian patterns for iconography. The picture of the birth of Muhammad in Rashid ad-Din's  is reminiscent of the birth of Jesus. The angels, hovering over the mother, correspond to a Christian type, while the three women, who came to visit the mother, conform to the three Biblical Magi. Some surviving Ayyubid inlaid brasses feature Gospel scenes and images of Madonna with infant Jesus. References to the Annunciation and the baptism of Jesus are manifest in al-Athar al-Baqiyah, where the Virgin is depicted in accordance with her representation in Byzantine art.

The frescoes of Samarra, painted between 836 and 883, also suggest the Christian craft because of the Christian priests who are the subjects and the signatures of the artist.

Cultural influence

Christians (particularly Nestorian Christians) contributed to the Arab Islamic civilization during the Umayyad and the Abbasid periods by translating works of Greek philosophers to Syriac and afterwards to Arabic. During the 4th through the 7th centuries, scholarly work in the Syriac and Greek languages was either newly initiated, or carried on from the Hellenistic period. Centers of learning and of transmission of classical wisdom included colleges such as the School of Nisibis, and later the School of Edessa, and the renowned hospital and medical academy of Jundishapur; libraries included the Library of Alexandria and the Imperial Library of Constantinople; other centers of translation and learning functioned at Merv, Salonika, Nishapur and Ctesiphon, situated just south of what later became Baghdad. The House of Wisdom was a library, translation institute, and academy established in Abbasid-era Baghdad, Iraq. Nestorians played a prominent role in the formation of Arab culture, with the Jundishapur school being prominent in the late Sassanid, Umayyad and early Abbasid periods. Notably, eight generations of the Nestorian Bukhtishu family served as private doctors to caliphs and sultans between the 8th and 11th centuries.

Translation of Greek works to Arabic was almost exclusively performed by Christian scholars. Egyptian priest and philosopher Jurj (or George) Shihatah Qanawati mentions over sixty translators, all of whom were Christians except one jew and one Sabaean. Baghdad received Scholars from all over Abbasid Caliphate who offered their services to the caliphs and rich sponsors. Some sponsors are known to have paid in gold the weight of each book translated into Arabic. The Nestorian Christian Hunayn ibn Ishaq was The most famous of the translator. He was a master in the  Arabic, Greek, Assyrian and Persian languages. He was also a writer and a teacher in the academy of Baghdad. He laid down the basis of accurate translating techniques, which was extremely important for the accurate transmission of knowledge. Hunayn says:

Hunayn is responsible for laying the foundation of scientific and philosophical terminology in Arabic, which was lacking until then, and which was essential for transmitting thought and knowledge. He worked with a team who translated almost the whole corpus of Galen’s medical works, as well as many of the works of Aristotle, Plato and Hippocrates.

Role of Christianity in science in the medieval Islamic world 

Christians, especially Nestorians, contributed to the Arab Islamic Civilization during the Umayyads and the Abbasids by translating works of Greek philosophers to Syriac and afterwards to Arabic. They also excelled in philosophy, science (such as Hunayn ibn Ishaq, Qusta ibn Luqa, Masawaiyh, Patriarch Eutychius, Jabril ibn Bukhtishu etc.) and theology (such as Tatian, Bar Daisan, Babai the Great, Nestorius, Toma bar Yacoub etc.) and the personal physicians of the Abbasid Caliphs were often Assyrian Christians such as the long serving Bukhtishu dynasty.

When Arabs and Islam arrived in the levant and mesopotania, they encountered 600 years of Assyrian Christian civilization, with a rich heritage, a highly developed culture, and advanced learning institutions. It is this civilization that became one of the great influencers of foundation of Islamic Civilization. The book "book How Greek Science Passed to the Arabs" gives a list of the best known scholars of the Abbasid caliphate's Golden Age. Out of theses 22 scholars, 20 were Christians (Assyrians), 1 was Persian (Zoroastrian) and 1 was Muslim.

Ibn Khaldun pointed out that the one civilization from which the Arabs had learned the sciences, was that of the Greeks, thanks to the translations by Christian scholars of Greek texts into Syriac and then into Arabic. Ibn Khaldun also records that Abbasid caliph al-Mansur requested from the Byzantine Emperor the mathematical works of the Greeks.

Role of Christianity in medicine in the medieval Islamic world 

The field of Islamic Medicine owes its origins to two Christians, Masawaiyh and Hunayn ibn Ishaq. The Nestorian Christian, Yahya ibn Masawayh, wrote many works on fevers, hygiene, and dietetics. Masawaiyh, served six caliphs as a physician, wrote 44 original works and translated many Greek medical works into Arabic, and was made the first head of the House of Wisdom by the Abbasid caliph al-Ma'mun. His was the first treatise on ophthalmology, but he was soon surpassed in this field by his famous pupil, Hunain ibn Ishaq, aka Johannitius, whom some regard as the father of Arab medicine. Razi, the physician of genius known in medieval Europe as Rhazes, profited greatly from the works started by Hunain ibn Ishaq. The Assyrian Christian named Stephanos translated the work of Greek physician Pedanius Dioscorides into the Arabic language, and for over a century, this translated medical text was used by the Muslim states.

For 200 years the Bukhtishu family, Assyrian Christians, were the physicians to the Caliphs of Baghdad and they founded the great medical school at Gundeshapur in Iran. When Abbasid Caliph al-Mansur became ill and no physician in Baghdad could cure him, he sent for the dean of the medical school in Gundeshapur, which was renowned as the best of its time. Many of them used their position in the Caliphs court to influence events and further the interests of their church and Christian community. They became advisors as well as confidential friends to many Caliphs. The first to see and greet Caliph Harun al-Rashid in the morning was his personal physician named Jabril ibn Bukhtishu, and when the fact that he was only a dhimmi caused jealousy, the caliph said: "But I owe my good health to him, and since the well being of the Muslims is dependent on me, their well-being is dependent on Jabril."

The number of Christian doctors in the Abbasid Caliphate was very large. Many of them wrote original works in medicine and translated medical works into Arabic. Because of this they obtained a special importance within Baghdadi society and acquired a particular prestige. This is shown by a story told by al-Jahiz about a Muslim physician named Asad bin Jani who explained why he didnt have any customers:

A hospital and medical training center existed at Gundeshapur. The city of Gundeshapur was founded in 271 by the Sassanid king Shapur I. It was one of the major cities in Khuzestan province of the Persian empire in what is today Iran. A large percentage of the population were Nestorian Christians, all of whom were exiled by the Byzantine Emperor Zeno in accordance with the doctrines of the Trinity which was established in the first Council of Nicea.

Under the rule of Khosrau I, refuge was granted to the Greek, and the Nestorian Christian philosophers including the scholars of the Persian School of Edessa (Urfa). Many neoplatonic scholars made their way to Gundeshapur in 529 following the closing of the academy of Athens by Emperor Justinian I. They were engaged in medical sciences and initiated the first translation projects of medical texts.  The arrival of these medical practitioners from Edessa marks the beginning of the hospital and medical center at Gundeshapur. It included a medical school and hospital (bimaristan), a pharmacology laboratory, a translation house, a library and an observatory. Indian doctors also contributed to the school at Gundeshapur, most notably the medical researcher Mankah. After the Muslim conquest of Persia, much of the region's study and literature were translated into Arabic at Baghdad.

An author observed that “The fourth Umayyad Caliph, Marwan I, ordered the translation … of the famous medical treatise of Aaron of Alexandria. The translation of medical literature was in fact a principal aspect of the scientific progress that distinguished the rule of the Umayyads.”

Immense scientific knowledge, (such as Galenic medical knowledge), fell into the hands of Muslims after their military conquest of the Christian city of Alexandria in the year 642. Muslim physicians would build upon these Greek works for their later reputation in the medical field.

Hispania (Al-Andalus)
Historian Pavón Maldonado says that “Spanish-Muslim art derives in large part from Roman, paleo-Christian, Byzantine, and Visigoth art.”
Muslims adopted the Visigoth horseshoe arch, seen in many Islamic buildings. The Mosque-Cathedral of Cordoba was built over the former Church of Saint Vincent (which was demolished and its parts used to build the Mosque).Darío Fernández-Morera says:

In the year 948 the Byzantine emperor gave the works of Pedanius Dioscorides to Caliph Abd al-Rahman III of Córdoba  in the original Greek. But they didnt know how to speak Greek so the emperor also sent a Greek monk, who instructed the Caliph's slaves in Greek.

Christian merchants and the silk trade

The one valuable item, sought for in Europe, which Iran possessed and which could bring in silver in sufficient quantities was silk, which was produced in the northern provinces, along the Caspian coastline. The trade of this product was done by Persians to begin with, but during the 17th century the Christian Armenians became increasingly vital in the trade of this merchandise, as middlemen.

Whereas domestic trade was largely in the hands of Persian and Jewish merchants, by the late 17th century, almost all foreign trade was controlled by the Armenians. They were even hired by wealthy Persian merchants to travel to Europe when they wanted to create commercial bases there, and the Armenians eventually established themselves in cities like Bursa, Aleppo, Venice, Livorno, Marseilles and Amsterdam. Realizing this, Shah Abbas resettled large numbers of Armenians from the Caucasus to his capital city and provided them with loans. As the shah realized the importance of doing trade with the Europeans, he assured that the Safavid society was one with religious tolerance. The Christian Armenians thus became a commercial elite in the Safavid society and managed to survive in the tough atmosphere of business being fought over by the British, Dutch, French, Indians and Persians, by always having large capital readily available and by managing to strike harder bargains ensuring cheaper prices than what, for instance, their British rivals ever were able to.

Ottoman Empire

Immediately after the Conquest of Constantinople, Mehmet II released the his portion of the city's captive Christian population with instructions to start the rebuilding of Constantinople which had been devastated by siege and war. Afterwards, he begin to also repopulate the city bringing new inhabitants – both Christian and Muslim – from the whole empire and from the newly conquered territories. Phanar was then repopulated with Greeks deported from Mouchlion in the Peloponnese and, after 1461, with citizens of Trebizond.

The roots of Greek ascendancy can be traced to the need of the Ottomans for skilled and educated negotiators as the power of their empire declined and they were compelled to rely on treaties more than the force of arms. From the 17th century onwards the Ottomans began facing problems in the conduct of their foreign relations, and were having difficulties in dictating terms to their neighbours; the Porte was faced for the first time with the need of participating in diplomatic negotiations. From 1669 until the Greek War of Independence in 1821, Phanariots made up the majority of the dragomans to the Ottoman government (the Porte) and foreign embassies due to the Greeks' higher level of education than the general Ottoman population. The roots of Greek success in the Ottoman Empire can be traced to the Greek tradition of education and commerce exemplified in the Phanariotes. It was the wealth of the extensive merchant class that provided the material basis for the intellectual revival that was the prominent feature of Greek life in the half century and more leading to the outbreak of the Greek War of Independence in 1821. Not coincidentally, on the eve of 1821, the three most important centres of Greek learning were situated in Chios, Smyrna and Aivali, all three major centres of Greek commerce. Greek success was also favoured by Greek domination in the leadership of the Eastern Orthodox church.

Given the Ottoman tradition of generally ignoring Western European languages and cultures, officials found themselves unable to handle such affairs. The Porte subsequently assigned those tasks to the Greeks who had a long mercantile and educational tradition and could provide the necessary skills. As a result, the so−called , Greek and Hellenized families mostly native to Constantinople, came to occupy high posts of secretaries and interpreters to Ottoman officials and officers.

The Armenians in the Ottoman Empire were made up of three religious denominations: Armenian Catholic, Armenian Protestant, and Armenian Apostolic, the Church of the vast majority of Armenians. The wealthy, Constantinople-based Amira class, a social elite whose members included the Duzians (Directors of the Imperial Mint), the Balyans (Chief Imperial Architects) and the Dadians (Superintendent of the Gunpowder Mills and manager of industrial factories). 

Scholars and intellectuals including Palestinian-American Edward Said affirm that Christians in the Arab world have made significant contributions to the Arab civilization since the introduction of Islam. The top poets in history were Arab Christians, and many Arab Christians are physicians, philosophers, government officials and people of literature. Arab Christians traditionally formed the educated upper class and they have had a significant impact in the culture of the Mashriq. Some of the most influential Arab nationalists were Arab Christians, like George Habash, founder of the Popular Front for the Liberation of Palestine, and Syrian intellectual Constantin Zureiq. Many Palestinian Christians were also active in the formation and governing of the Palestinian National Authority since 1992. The suicide bomber Jules Jammal, a Syrian military officer who blew himself up while ramming a French ship, was also an Arab Christian. While Lebanese Maronite Christian were among the Masters and Fathers of the Arabic Renaissance .

Because Arab Christians formed the educated class, they had a significant impact on the politics and culture of the Arab World. Christian colleges like Saint Joseph University and American University of Beirut (Syrian Protestant College until 1920) thrived in Lebanon, Al-Hikma University in Baghdad amongst others played leading role in the development of civilization and Arab culture. Given this role in politics and culture, Ottoman ministers began to include them in their governments. In the economic sphere, a number of Christian families like Sursock became prominent. Thus, the Nahda led the Muslims and Christians to a cultural renaissance and national general despotism. This solidified Arab Christians as one of the pillars of the region and not a minority on the fringes.

Today Middle Eastern Christians are relatively wealthy, well educated, and politically moderate, as they have today an active role in various social, economical, sporting and political aspects in the Middle East. Arab Christians have significantly influenced and contributed to the Arabic culture in many fields both historically and in modern times, including literature, politics, business, philosophy, music, theatre and cinema, medicine, and science.

Anatolian Beyliks
One of the important Christian practices that Muslims in Anatolia appropriated, was baptism (called vaftiz in the turkish language). Muslims in Anatolia adopted baptism as early as the twelfth century:

See also
Isra'iliyyat, Judaism-related influences on Islam
List of Christian scientists and scholars of the medieval Islamic world

Notes

Further reading
Eva Baer. Ayyubid metalwork with Christian images. BRILL, 1989

Christianity and Islam
Christian culture
Christianity in the Abbasid Caliphate
Christianity in Al-Andalus
Christianity in the Fatimid Caliphate
Christianity in the Ottoman Empire
Christianity in the Umayyad Caliphate
Cultural exchange
History of Eastern Christianity
Islamic Golden Age
Multiculturalism and Christianity
Multiculturalism and Islam